Syrrusis is a genus of moths of the family Noctuidae.

Species
 Syrrusis ethiopica (Hampson, 1907)
 Syrrusis milloti (Viette, 1972)
 Syrrusis monticola (Viette, 1959)
 Syrrusis notabilis (Butler, 1879)
 Syrrusis pictura (Saalmüller, 1891)
 Syrrusis vau (Berio, 1955)

References

Natural History Museum Lepidoptera genus database
Syrrusis at funet

Hadeninae
Noctuoidea genera